Kuwait–Mexico relations are the diplomatic relations between Kuwait and Mexico. Both nations are members of the United Nations.

History
Both nations established diplomatic relations on 23 July 1975. On 28 July 1975, Mexican President Luis Echeverría paid an official four day visit to Kuwait. During his visit, President Echeverría met with Kuwaiti Emir Sabah Al-Salim Al-Sabah and together they visited a petrol chemical plant and a desalinization water plant. The two leaders also discussed then-current events taking place in the Middle East.

During the Gulf War Mexico placed its own sanctions on Iraq after it invaded Kuwait. In 2010, Kuwait opened an embassy in Mexico City. In July 2010, Kuwaiti Prime Minister Nasser Al-Sabah paid an official visit to Mexico and met with Mexican President Felipe Calderón. During the visit, both leaders agreed on a memorandum to establish a consulting mechanism on mutual interests to increase political dialogue and cooperation in all fields. In September 2010, Prime Minister Nasser Al-Sabah returned to Mexico to partake in the country's bicentennial celebration. In February 2011, Mexican Foreign Minister Patricia Espinosa Cantellano paid a visit to Kuwait and partook in that country's Golden Jubilee, 50th year of Independence, 20th year of freedom since the Iraqi invasion and 5th year of the ascension to the throne of Emir Sabah Al-Ahmad Al-Jaber Al-Sabah. Mexico opened an embassy in the Kuwaiti capital in 2011.

In March 2014, Mexican Foreign Minister José Antonio Meade paid a visit to Kuwait. During the visit, both nations agreed to eliminate visa requirements for diplomatic passport holders. In December 2014, Mexico awarded the Order of the Aztec Eagle to Kuwaiti Emir Sabah Al-Ahmad Al-Jaber Al-Sabah. In January 2016, Mexican President Enrique Peña Nieto paid an official visit to Kuwait. During his visit, both nations signed ten agreements and memorandums in energy and health cooperation.

High-level visits

High-level visits from Kuwait to Mexico
 Prime Minister Nasser Al-Sabah (July and September 2010)
 Vice Minister of Interior Sulaiman Fahad Al Fahad (2016)

High-level visits from Mexico to Kuwait
 President Luis Echeverría (1975)
 Foreign Undersecretary Lourdes Aranda (2007, 2011)
 Foreign Minister Patricia Espinosa Cantellano (2011)
 Foreign Minister José Antonio Meade (2014)
 Foreign Undersecretary Carlos de Icaza (2014)
 President Enrique Peña Nieto (2016)

Bilateral agreements
Both nations have signed several bilateral agreements such as an Economic Cooperation agreement; Agreement on the Avoidance of Double-Taxation and Tax Evasion; Cooperation Commission; Agreement on the Promotion and Reciprocal Protection of Investments; Agreement of Cooperation between Pemex and the Kuwait Petroleum Corporation; Air service and Tourism Agreement; Agreement on Cultural, Artistic and Superior Education Cooperation; Agreement on Political and Health Cooperation; Agreement on Cooperation between the Kuwaiti and Mexican News Agencies and an Agreement on Cooperation to Combat International Organized Crime and Narcotrafficking.

Trade
In 2018, total trade between Kuwait and Mexico totaled US$61 million. Kuwait's main exports to Mexico include: household supplies and memory chips. Mexico's main exports to Kuwait include: trucks, tubes, motorbikes, garbanzo beans and pepper. In January 2016, Mexican tubing company, Tenaris Tamsa, announced a US$150 million investment in Kuwait. The Kuwait Foreign Petroleum Exploration Company has joined with Mexican petroleum company, Pemex, for exploration and production of oil and gas in Mexico and elsewhere. Kuwait is Mexico's 89th largest trading partner. Mexican multinational company KidZania operates in Kuwait.

Resident diplomatic missions 
 Kuwait has an embassy in Mexico City.
 Mexico has an embassy in Kuwait City.

References

Mexico
Kuwait